Robert Armstrong may refer to:

Arts and entertainment
Robert Armstrong (actor) (1890–1973), film actor
Robert Armstrong (cartoonist) (born 1950), American underground comics artist and musician, coined the term "couch potato"
Robert Armstrong (Irish artist), winner of the 1984 Guinness Peat Aviation Award

Fictional characters
 Robert Armstrong (Home and Away), character in the Australian soap opera
 Robert Armstrong (Noble House), a character from the James Clavell's novel

Government and military
Robert Armstrong (Australian politician) (born 1952), member of the Tasmanian Legislative Council
Robert Armstrong (Northern Ireland politician) (1888/9–1961), member of the Senate of Northern Ireland
Robert Armstrong (1792–1854), officer in the United States Army
Robert Armstrong, Baron Armstrong of Ilminster (1927–2020), British member of the House of Lords and former civil servant
Robert Baynes Armstrong (1785–1869), British Member of Parliament for Lancaster
Robert E. Armstrong (1925–2008), American mayor of Fort Wayne, Indiana
Robert P. Armstrong (born 1938), Canadian lawyer and judge
Robert Young Armstrong (1839–1894), British soldier and fellow of the Royal Society

Other
Robert Armstrong (baseball) (1850–1917), American professional baseball player
Robert Armstrong (cricketer) (1836–1863), English cricketer
Robert Armstrong (racehorse trainer) (1944–2021), British racehorse trainer
Robert Archibald Armstrong (1788–1867), Gaelic lexicographer
 Robert C. Armstrong, chemical engineer at MIT
Robert John Armstrong (1884–1957), fourth Bishop of Sacramento

See also
Bob Armstrong (disambiguation)
Robert Armstrong-Jones (1857–1943), Welsh physician and psychiatrist
Rob Armstrong (born 1996), Canadian ice sledge hockey player